Hoërskool Tygerberg is a public Afrikaans medium co-educational high school situated in Parow in the Western Cape province of South Africa. It is a government funded School, The high school was established in 1954.

Background and history

The school was founded in 1954. The first principal was M. du T. Potgieter.

Motto
There is work.

Through the years
Potgieter served as principal up to 1963. D.A. Kotzé  took over for one year. After Kotzé, the school had numerous principals: R.K. de Villiers 1964–1967, S.W. Walters 1968–1972,  J.A. de Jager 1973–1975, J.A. van Wyk  1976–1984, F.P.J. Smit 1985–1990, J.A. de Vries  1991–1993, A.J.C. Schreuder 1994–1997 and C.E. van der Westhuizen 1997–2011. The current principal is  L.S. Herselman, who started in 2012.

Improvements
The schools new buildings were opened on 7 August 1981.

Language

The language medium is Afrikaans and English.

Choir

The Tygerberg High School Choir took part in the 35th World International Youth Music Competition in Vienna, Austria. The choir won the second place prize.

Athletics
They represent the "T" in the MTBS annual interschool's athletics competition. The other school participating are "M" for DF Malan, "B" for Bellville and "S" for  Stellenberg.

Alumni
François Bloemhof – Author 
Rochelle Lawson – South Africa Protea Netball Player (Goal Defence)
Eben Etzebeth – Springbok Rugby Player (Lock and Captain)
Justin Geduld – South Africa sevens rugby player.
James Kriel – Head of the South African Airforce
Juarno Augustus –  rugby player, playing eighthman.
Marvin Orie – Springbok rugby player
Faffa Knoetze – Springbok rugby player

References

Schools in Cape Town
High schools in South Africa
Schools in the Western Cape
1954 establishments in South Africa
Educational institutions established in 1954